"Presidential" is a song by rap duo YoungBloodZ. It was released in June 2005 as the second single from their second studio album Ev'rybody Know Me. The song peaked at number 81 on the U.S. Billboard Hot 100 chart and number 20 on the U.S. Billboard Hot Rap Tracks chart. An official remix was released on the same album featuring Akon.

Music video
The music video was directed by Lenny Bass and premiered in August 2005. The music video features a cameo from T-Pain, Chris Brown, 8Ball & MJG, and Boyz n da Hood.

Charts

References

2005 singles
YoungBloodZ songs
2005 songs
Songs written by LRoc
Songs written by Lil Jon
Song recordings produced by Lil Jon
LaFace Records singles
Crunk songs